Fuzzy subalgebras theory is a chapter of fuzzy set theory. It is obtained from an interpretation in a multi-valued logic of axioms usually expressing the notion of subalgebra of a given algebraic structure.

Definition 

Consider a first order language for algebraic structures with a monadic predicate symbol S. Then a fuzzy subalgebra is a fuzzy model of a theory containing, for any n-ary operation h, the axioms

and, for any constant c, S(c).

The first axiom expresses the closure of S with respect to the operation h, and the second expresses the fact that c is an element in S. As an example, assume that the valuation structure is defined in [0,1] and denote by  the operation in [0,1] used to interpret the conjunction. Then a fuzzy subalgebra of an algebraic structure whose domain is D is defined by a fuzzy subset  of D such that, for every d1,...,dn in D, if h is the interpretation of the n-ary operation symbol h, then

 

Moreover, if c is the interpretation of a constant c such that s(c) = 1.

A largely studied class of fuzzy subalgebras is the one in which the operation  coincides with the minimum. In such a case it is immediate to prove the following proposition.

Proposition. A fuzzy subset s of an algebraic structure defines a fuzzy subalgebra if and only if for every λ in [0,1], the closed cut {x ∈ D : s(x)≥ λ} of s is a subalgebra.

Fuzzy subgroups and submonoids 

The fuzzy subgroups and the fuzzy submonoids are particularly interesting classes of fuzzy subalgebras. In such a case a fuzzy subset s of a monoid (M,•,u) is a fuzzy submonoid if and only if

 
 

where u is the neutral element in A.

Given a group G, a fuzzy subgroup of G is a fuzzy submonoid s of G such that 
 s(x) ≤ s(x−1).

It is possible to prove that the notion of fuzzy subgroup is strictly related with the notions of fuzzy equivalence. In fact, assume that S is a set, G a group of transformations in S and (G,s) a fuzzy subgroup of G. Then, by setting 

 e(x,y) = Sup{s(h) : h is an element in G such that h(x) = y}

we obtain a fuzzy equivalence. Conversely, let e be a fuzzy equivalence in S and, for every transformation h of S, set 

 s(h)= Inf{e(x,h(x)): x∈S}.

Then s defines a fuzzy subgroup of transformation in S. In a similar way we can relate the fuzzy submonoids with the fuzzy orders.

Bibliography 
 Klir, G. and Bo Yuan, Fuzzy Sets and Fuzzy Logic (1995) 
 Zimmermann H., Fuzzy Set Theory and its Applications (2001), .
 Chakraborty H. and Das S., On fuzzy equivalence 1, Fuzzy Sets and Systems, 11 (1983), 185-193.
 Demirci M., Recasens J., Fuzzy groups, fuzzy functions and fuzzy equivalence relations, Fuzzy Sets and Systems, 144 (2004), 441-458.
 Di Nola A., Gerla G., Lattice valued algebras, Stochastica, 11 (1987), 137-150.
 Hájek P., Metamathematics of fuzzy logic. Kluwer 1998.
 Klir G., UTE H. St.Clair and Bo Yuan Fuzzy Set Theory Foundations and Applications,1997.
 Gerla G., Scarpati M., Similarities, Fuzzy Groups: a Galois Connection, J. Math. Anal. Appl., 292 (2004), 33-48.
Mordeson J., Kiran R. Bhutani and Azriel Rosenfeld. Fuzzy Group Theory, Springer Series: Studies in Fuzziness and Soft Computing, Vol. 182, 2005.
 Rosenfeld A., Fuzzy groups, J. Math. Anal. Appl., 35 (1971), 512-517.
 Zadeh L.A., Fuzzy Sets, ‘’Information and Control’’, 8 (1965) 338353.
 Zadeh L.A., Similarity relations and fuzzy ordering, Inform. Sci. 3 (1971) 177–200.

Fuzzy logic